The 2019 Koblenz Open was a professional tennis tournament played on indoor hard courts. It was the third edition of the tournament which was part of the 2019 ATP Challenger Tour. It took place in Koblenz, Germany between 14 and 20 January 2019.

Singles main-draw entrants

Seeds

 1 Rankings are as of 7 January 2019.

Other entrants
The following players received wildcards into the singles main draw:
  Marek Gengel
  Johannes Härteis
  Benjamin Hassan
  Kai Lemstra
  Julian Lenz

The following player received entry into the singles main draw using a protected ranking:
  Michał Przysiężny

The following players received entry into the singles main draw using their ITF World Tennis Ranking:
  Javier Barranco Cosano
  Raúl Brancaccio
  Peter Heller
  Roman Safiullin

The following players received entry from the qualifying draw:
  Peter Torebko
  Louis Wessels

The following players received entry as lucky losers:
  Riccardo Bonadio
  Bastien Presuhn

Champions

Singles

 Gianluca Mager def.  Roberto Ortega Olmedo 2–6, 7–6(8–6), 6–2.

Doubles

 Zdeněk Kolář /  Adam Pavlásek def.  Jürgen Melzer /  Filip Polášek 6–3, 6–4.

External links
 Official website

2019 ATP Challenger Tour
2019
2019 in German tennis
January 2019 sports events in Germany